Dasyuromyia is a genus of bristle flies in the family Tachinidae.

Species
Dasyuromyia aperta Aldrich, 1934
Dasyuromyia inornata (Walker, 1836)
Dasyuromyia lloydi Blanchard, 1947
Dasyuromyia nervosa (Walker, 1836)
Dasyuromyia nigriceps Aldrich, 1934
Dasyuromyia sarcophagidea (Bigot, 1888)
Dasyuromyia sternalis Aldrich, 1934
Dasyuromyia tarsalis Aldrich, 1934

References

Dexiinae
Diptera of South America
Tachinidae genera
Taxa named by Jacques-Marie-Frangile Bigot